Dégagnac is a commune in the Lot department in south-western France.

Geography
The river Céou forms all of the commune's north-eastern border.

See also
Communes of the Lot department

References

Communes of Lot (department)